Andrew "Andy" John Ashurst (born 2 January 1965) is male British former pole vaulter.

Athletics career
Ashurst competed in the 1988 Summer Olympics.

He represented England and won a gold medal in the pole vault, at the 1986 Commonwealth Games in Edinburgh, Scotland. Four years later he represented England, at the 1990 Commonwealth Games in Auckland, New Zealand and competed in a third Games when he represented England, at the 1994 Commonwealth Games in Victoria, British Columbia, Canada.

Personal life
Ashurst attended Sale Boys' Grammar School. His daughter Sophie is also a keen pole vaulter who is coached by her father as well as attending Loughborough University.

International competitions

References

1965 births
Living people
British male pole vaulters
Olympic athletes of Great Britain
Athletes (track and field) at the 1988 Summer Olympics
Athletes (track and field) at the 1986 Commonwealth Games
Athletes (track and field) at the 1990 Commonwealth Games
Athletes (track and field) at the 1994 Commonwealth Games
Commonwealth Games medallists in athletics
Commonwealth Games gold medallists for England
Medallists at the 1986 Commonwealth Games